Azmeera Chandulal (17 August 1954 – 15 April 2021) was an Indian politician who served as Tourism and Tribal Welfare Minister of Telangana and Member of Legislative Assembly from Mulugu constituency until 2018.

Early life
Azmeera Chandulal was born on 17 August 1954 at Jaggannapet in Warangal District.

Political career
He once served the state government of Andhra Pradesh as Minister for Tribal Welfare as a ruling party member under Nandamuri Taraka Rama Rao (NTR). He was elected three times to Assembly from Mulugu Constituency as Legislative Member, and twice as a Member of Parliament from Warangal.

In 2014 Telangana Assembly Election he was re-elected from Mulugu Assembly constituency. He was inducted into Cabinet on June 2, 2014, and made Tourism and Culture Minister of Telangana.

Personal life
He was married to Sharada and had 3 sons.

Positions held
1981-85 Sarpanch, Village Jaggannapet Mandal, Warangal district, Andhra Pradesh
1985-89 and Member, Andhra Pradesh Legislative Assembly (1st term) 
1986-88 and chairman, Committee on the Welfare of Scheduled Castes and Scheduled Tribes
1989 Cabinet Minister, Tribal Welfare, Andhra Pradesh
1994 to 1996 Re-elected to Member, Andhra Pradesh Legislative Assembly (2nd term)
1994-96 Member, Politbureau, Telugu Desam Party
1996 Elected to 11th Lok Sabha (1st term) Warangal 
1996-97 Member, Committee on Labour and Welfare
1998 Re-elected to 12th Lok Sabha (2nd term) Warangal 
1998-99 Member, Committee on Human Resource Development
Member, Committee on Labour and Welfare
Member, Committee on Members of Parliament Local Area Development Scheme
Member, Consultative Committee, Ministry of Social Justice and Empowerment
1999-2001 S.T. Cell State President, Telugu Desam Party
2001-2003 Director TRIFED, New Delhi, Govt. of India
2003-2005 TRICOR Chairman, Andhra Pradesh
2004 Joined Telangana Rashtra Samithi
2006 Politbureau Member, Telangana Rashtra Samithi
2014 Re-elected, Member of Legislative Assembly, Mulugu Constituency, Warangal Dist., Telangana State (3rd term)
2014 to December 2018 – Minister Tribal welfare, tourism and cultural portfolios, Telangana

References

http://loksabhaph.nic.in/writereaddata/biodata_1_12/3641.htm. 

1954 births
2021 deaths
Andhra Pradesh MLAs 1985–1989
Andhra Pradesh MLAs 1994–1999
Telangana MLAs 2014–2018
India MPs 1996–1997
India MPs 1998–1999
Telangana Rashtra Samithi politicians
People from Hanamkonda district
Deaths from the COVID-19 pandemic in India